Hair is a 1968 cast recording of the musical Hair on the RCA Victor label.  Sarah Erlewine, for AllMusic, wrote:  "The music is heartening and invigorating, including the classics 'Aquarius,' 'Good Morning Starshine,' 'Let the Sunshine In,' 'Frank Mills' ... and 'Easy to Be Hard.' The joy that has been instilled in this original Broadway cast recording shines through, capturing in the performances of creators Gerome Ragni and James Rado exactly what they were aiming for — not to speak for their generation, but to speak for themselves."

The album charted at No. 1 on the Billboard 200, the last Broadway cast album to do so. Hairs cast album stayed at No. 1 for 13 weeks in 1969.

The recording also received a Grammy Award in 1969 for Best Score from an Original Cast Show Album and sold nearly 3 million copies in the U.S. by December 1969. The New York Times noted in 2007 that "The cast album of Hair was ... a must-have for the middle classes. Its exotic orange-and-green cover art imprinted itself instantly and indelibly on the psyche. ...  [It] became a pop-rock classic that, like all good pop, has an appeal that transcends particular tastes for genre or period." In 2018, the Original Broadway Cast Recording was added to the National Recording Registry.

Track listing 
Music by Galt MacDermot; lyrics by Gerome Ragni and James Rado.
 "Aquarius" 2:55 — Ronnie Dyson
 "Donna" 2:08 — Gerome Ragni
 "Hashish" 1:03 — Cast
 "Sodomy" 0:50 Steve Curry
 "Colored Spade" 1:10 — Lamont Washington
 "Manchester England" 1:20 — James Rado
 "I'm Black" 0:36 — Lamont Washington, Steve Curry, Gerome Ragni, James Rado
 "Ain't Got No" 0:43 — Steve Curry, Lamont Washington, Melba Moore
 "I Believe In Love" 1:06 — Melba Moore*
 "Ain't Got No" (reprise) 1:16 — Steve Curry, Lamont Washington, Melba Moore
 "Air" 1:15 — Sally Eaton, Shelley Plimpton, Melba Moore
 "Initials (LBJ)" 0:55 — Cast
 "I Got Life" 3:05 — James Rado
 "Going Down" 2:18 — Gerome Ragni*
 "Hair" 2:55 — James Rado, Gerome Ragni
 "My Conviction" 1:36 — Jonathan Kramer
 "Easy to Be Hard" 2:35 — Lynn Kellogg
 "Don't Put It Down" 2:00 — Steve Curry, Gerome Ragni
 "Frank Mills" 2:05 — Shelley Plimpton
 "Be-In (Hare Krishna)" 3:00 — Cast
 "Where Do I Go?" 2:40 — James Rado
 "Electric Blues" 2:35 — Paul Jabara*
 "Manchester England" (Reprise) 0:30 — James Rado
 "Black Boys" 1:10 — Diane Keaton, Suzannah Norstrand, Natalie Mosco
 "White Boys" 2:28 — Melba Moore, Lorrie Davis & Emmaretta Marks
 "Walking In Space" 5:00 — Cast
 "Abie Baby" 2:45 — Lamont Washington, Ronnie Dyson, Donnie Burks & Lorrie Davis
 "Three-Five-Zero-Zero" 3:09 — Cast
 "What a Piece of Work is Man" 1:36 — Ronnie Dyson & Walter Michael Harris
 "Good Morning Starshine" 2:30 — Lynn Kellogg, Melba Moore, James Rado, Gerome Ragni
 "The Bed" 2:56 — Cast*
 "The Flesh Failures (Let the Sunshine In)" 3:35 — James Rado, Lynn Kellogg, Melba Moore

* The original LP release (RCA Victor LSO-1150) omitted a few tracks due to space limitations: "I Believe In Love", "Going Down", "Electric Blues" and "The Bed", as well as short reprises, and placed "Easy to Be Hard" after "Black Boys/White Boys". The full track list above was included on later CD issues.

Charts

Certifications and sales

Credits
Alan Fontaine, Steve Gillette — guitar
Jimmy Lewis — bass
Galt McDermot — piano, electric piano, orchestra director
Idris Muhammad — drums
Warren Chiasson — vibraphone, percussion
Donald Leight, Eddy Williams — trumpet
Zane Paul — flute, woodwinds
Donnie Burks, Steve Curry, Lorrie Davis, Ronald Dyson, Sally Eaton, Leata Galloway, Steve Gamet, Walter Harris, Paul Jabara, Diane Keaton, Hiram Keller, Lynn Kellogg, Jonathan Kramer, Marjorie LiPari, Emmaretta Marks, Melba Moore, Mike Moran, Natalie Mosco, Suzannah Norstrand, Shelley Plimpton, James Rado, Gerome Ragni, Robert Rubinsky, Lamont Washington — vocals

Cover versions
Nina Simone covered "Ain't Got No, I Got Life" in 1968, peaking at number 2 in the UK and at number 1 in the Netherlands. It also charted on the Billboard Hot 100, where it reached number 94.
The 5th Dimension covered "Aquarius/Let the Sunshine In" in 1969, creating a #1 hit single.
The Cowsills covered "Hair" in 1969, hitting #2.
Oliver covered "Good Morning Starshine" in 1969, hitting #3.
Strawberry Alarm Clock covered "Good Morning Starshine" in 1969, charting at #87.
Three Dog Night covered "Easy to Be Hard" in 1969, hitting #4.
Run–D.M.C. sampled "Where Do I Go?" in their 1993 song "Down with the King", which charted at #21 on the Hot 100.

See also
Hair (Original Off-Broadway Cast Recording)
Hair: Original Soundtrack Recording

References 

Cast recordings
1968 albums
United States National Recording Registry recordings
RCA Victor soundtracks